Canik Mountains are mountains in Turkey. The western part is in Samsun Province and eastern part in Ordu Province extending to the Black Sea.

Mountain ranges of Turkey
Black Sea Region